Otto Steinert (12 July 1915 – 3 March 1978) was a German photographer.

Life and work
Born in Saarbrücken, Germany, Steinert was a medical doctor by profession and was self-taught in photography. After World War II, he initially worked for the State School for Art and Craft (Staatliche Schule für Kunst und Handwerk, today HTW) in Saarbrücken.

He was the founder of the Fotoform photography group.

From 1959, he taught at the Folkwang Hochschule design school  in Essen, where he later died.

His archive is part of the photographic collection of the Museum Folkwang, Essen.

Exhibitions
Museum Folkwang, Essen, Germany, 2015/2016

Publications
Parisian Forms. Göttingen, Germany: Steidl, 2008. Edited by Ute Eskildsen. . Published in conjunction with an exhibition at Museum Folkwang, Essen.

Collections
Steinert's work is held in the following public collections:
Metropolitan Museum of Art, New York: 2 prints (as of November 2019)
Museum of Modern Art, New York: 3 prints (as of November 2019)

References

External links
 Images by Otto Steinert (PDF)

1915 births
1978 deaths
Photographers from Saarland
People from Saarbrücken
People from the Rhine Province
Recipients of the Cross of the Order of Merit of the Federal Republic of Germany